Mount Tokachi may refer to:
 Mount Tokachi (Daisetsuzan), a volcano in  Daisetsuzan National Park, central Hokkaidō, Japan
 Mount Tokachi (Hidaka), a mountain in the Hidaka Mountains of eastern Hokkaidō, Japan